This was the 1995–96 Balkan League season, the second season of the multi-national ice hockey league. Six teams participated in the league, and Steaua Bucuresti of Romania won the championship by defeating Sportul Studentesc Bucharest in the final.

Regular season

Playoffs

Semifinals
Steaua Bucuresti - KHK Crvena Zvezda 5-3
Sportul Studentesc Bucharest - Slavia Sofia 8-3

3rd place
KHK Crvena Zvezda - Slavia Sofia 5-1

Final
Steaua Bucuresti - Sportul Studentesc Bucharest 8-2

External links
Season on hockeyarchives.info

2
Balkan League (ice hockey) seasons